Poland has a rich selection of Gold and Silver commemorative coins. In the year 2006 coins were launched in the series: "Animals of the World", "History of the Polish Złoty", "The Polish Calendar of Traditional Customs and Rituals", "Monuments of Material Culture in Poland" (previously "Castles and Palaces in Poland"),"History of the Polish Cavalry", "Polish Painters of the Turn of 19th and 20th Centuries" and various occasional coins.

Table of contents

See also 

 Numismatics
 Regular issue coinage
 Coin grading

References 

Commemorative coins of Poland